, is a 2007 Japanese crime film directed by Takashi Miike, based on the 2005 PlayStation 2 video game Yakuza. The film stars Kazuki Kitamura, Goro Kishitani, Show Aikawa, Yoshiyoshi Arakawa, Kenichi Endō and Tomorowo Taguchi.

The English-subtitled version premiered on June 23, 2008, at New York Asian Film Festival, and was released on DVD in Northern America on February 23, 2010, by an affiliate of Media Blasters.

Plot

The plot is loosely based on the original Yakuza game and is a separate, "one-night-story" that unfolds in a hot summer night in Kamurocho, the fictitious version of Tokyo Shinjuku's Kabukichō.

The night begins with a bank robbery by a manzai duo of amateur masked gunmen, and the disappearance of ten billion yen belonging to the Tojo Clan, a powerful yakuza syndicate. Meanwhile, in the streets of Kamurocho, former yakuza Kazuma Kiryu and his adopted daughter, a young girl called Haruka Sawamura, search for Mizuki Sawamura, the latter's mother and the sister of Kiryu's childhood love, with Kiryu's old rival, the psychotic yakuza Goro Majima, and his men following them.

After a meeting with Kiryu and Haruka in a convenience store called Poppo, employee Satoru and his new girlfriend Yui decide to start holding up stores for money and for fun. Elsewhere in the district, a mysterious Korean hitman, Park, tracks down the culprit behind the Tojo Clan heist, which leads him towards the infamous Jingu, a figure also known as Mister N, and the Kamurocho landmark, the Millennium Tower.

The search for Mizuki brings Kiryu to the top of Millennium Tower and ends with a climactic battle against yakuza Akira Nishikiyama, Kiryu's childhood best friend and former blood brother, who declares his intention to beat Kiryu and finally prove he is the better man.

Video
Amuse Soft Entertainment released the regular DVD edition on September 28, 2007, in Japan, with a limited edition "Deluxe Box" featuring three Kubrick figures (Majima, Kiryu and Haruka).

American distributor Tokyo Shock released a licensed DVD titled Yakuza: Like a Dragon on February 23, 2010, to coincide with the North American localization of Yakuza 3. The release date was originally planned to March, probably in order to coincide with the North American localization of the PlayStation 3 video game Yakuza 3.

Prior to this official release, an English-subtitled DVD was distributed in North America by Bonzai RCS; its case featured a Korean cover for some reason (it was likely an unlicensed product); it was similar to the Korean market edition by CJ Entertainment.

As of November 2020, it is available on the streaming service provider Fandor, under the title of simply Yakuza.

Soundtrack
The motion picture soundtrack features three songs by Crazy Ken Band from his 2006 album Galaxy released on the Almond Eyes label (XNAE-10010), these are Hama no Ambassador (ハマのアンバサダー, hama no anbasada, lit. "ambassador of Yokohama") featuring Fire Ball and Papa B., Kuroi Kizuato no Blues (黒い傷跡のブルース, kuroi kizuato no burusu, lit. "black scar blues") and the ending theme 12 gatsu 17 nichi (12月17日, lit. "December 17th"). The latter two are also included in the Yakuza 2 game's soundtrack.

Cast

Kazuki Kitamura as Kazuma Kiryu (桐生一馬)
Natsuo as Haruka Sawamura (澤村遥)
 as Goro Majima (真島吾朗)
Shun Shioya as Satoru (悟)
Saeko as Yui (唯)
Haruhiko Kato as Kazuki (一輝)
Saki Takaoka as Yumi Sawamura (澤村由美) / Mizuki Sawamura (美月)
Show Aikawa as detective Noguchi (野口刑事)
Gong Yoo as Park the Korean hitman (朴)
Yutaka Matsushige as Makoto Date (伊達真)
Claude Maki as Akira Nishikiyama (錦山彰)
Yoshiyoshi Arakawa as the Korean-Japanese weapon smuggler (武器屋)
Kenichi Endō as Imanishi the bank robber (今井)
Sansei Shiomi as Shintaro Kazama (風間新太郎)
Tomorowo Taguchi as the Korean-Japanese barbershop owner
Toshihiro Nagoshi as Jingu but listed as Mister N (ミスターN)
Alexander Otsuka as a Yakuza (ヤクザ)

See also
 List of films based on video games

References

External links
 Official website
 
  on Fandor
 
 

2000s crime drama films
2007 films
Films directed by Takashi Miike
Films set in Tokyo
Japanese crime comedy films
2000s Japanese-language films
2000s Korean-language films
Live-action films based on video games
Films based on Sega video games
movie version
Like a Dragon: Movie Version
2000s Japanese films